The Geelong Pride Film Festival is an LGBT film festival held in Geelong, Victoria, Australia. 

The festival screens contemporary and classic LGBTIQA+ themed feature-length and short films and is one of the largest regional LGBTIQA+ film festivals in Australia. The first festival in 2018 was a sold-out event. The festival is run by volunteers through a non-profit incorporated association.  The festival aims to bring more diverse films to the Geelong region and to contribute to the development of a vibrant community in Geelong for those who identify as LGBTQIA+ and their allies.

Each year GPFF presents themed collections of short films including Youth Shorts, Rainbow Shorts (a collection of short films from across the LGBTIQ+ spectrum) and Happy Endings (a collection of short films from around the world that have positive, uplifting or humorous endings for LGBTIQ+ people). Other collections have included: Celebrating Elders; Gender Frontiers; Lesbian Shorts; Gay Shorts; Documentary Shorts; From Now On - New Beginnings; and Knowing Me, Knowing Her LBTQ Women's Shorts.

History 

The festival began with a single film screening in 2017 and the first full festival was held in 2018. The first screening was 21st Anniversary screening of Hettie MacDonald's film Beautiful Thing. The Centrepiece screening of the first festival was Ian W Thompson's documentary Out in the Line-up which included a Q&A with producer and documentary subject Thomas Castets in conversation with Joel Carnegie.

In 2019 the Geelong Pride Film Festival was held from April 5–7 at the Pivotonian Cinema and Courthouse Youth Arts.

On 17 October 2019 Geelong Pride Film presented a special screening of John Waters' 1981 film Polyester to coincide with John Waters' 2019 Australian tour. This presentation featured the newly remastered edition of the film and was screened with Odorama cards.

The 2020 Geelong Pride Film Festival was postponed due to the COVID-19 pandemic and was restaged as an online event in October and November 2020. The 2021 Geelong Pride Film Festival was a hybrid event combining online and cinema screenings featuring 9 feature films and fifty-six short films across six themed collections. In 2021 five of the feature films were presented in partnership with Melbourne Queer Film Festival.

The 2022 Geelong Pride Film Festival included ten feature films and fifty short films. Opening night 2022 celebrated the return to cinemas with a sold-out party and screening of Todd Stephens' Swan Song starring Udo Kier.

See also 

 List of LGBT film festivals
 List of LGBT events

References

External links 
 Geelong Pride Film Festival
 GPFF Facebook Page
 GPFF Twitter Account
 GPFF Instagram Account
 GPFF Film Freeway portal

LGBT film festivals in Australia
Culture in Geelong